Unmarried Wives is a 1924 American silent drama film directed by James P. Hogan and starring Mildred Harris, Gladys Brockwell and Lloyd Whitlock.

Cast
 Mildred Harris as Princess Sonya
 Gladys Brockwell as Mrs. Gregory
 Lloyd Whitlock as Tom Gregory
 Bernard Randall as Morris Sands
 George Cooper as 	Joe Dugan
 Alice Davenport as 'Ma' Casey 
 Majel Coleman as Mrs. Lowell

References

Bibliography
 Connelly, Robert B. The Silents: Silent Feature Films, 1910-36, Volume 40, Issue 2. December Press, 1998.
 Munden, Kenneth White. The American Film Institute Catalog of Motion Pictures Produced in the United States, Part 1. University of California Press, 1997.

External links
 

1924 films
1924 drama films
1920s English-language films
American silent feature films
American comedy films
Films directed by James Patrick Hogan
American black-and-white films
Gotham Pictures films
1920s American films
Silent American comedy films